Katarina Köhler (born 1954) is a Swedish politician, teacher and former member of the Riksdag, the national legislature. A member of the Social Democratic Party, she represented Västerbotten County between October 2010 and September 2018. She had previously been a substitute member of the Riksdag for Ibrahim Baylan twice: October 2006; and September 2007 to December 2007.

Köhler is the daughter of farmer Gunnar Köhler and Aili Regina Köhler. She was educated in Gällivare. She studied organisational development and leadership at Dalarna University and process pedagogy at Luleå University of Technology. She was a teacher in Skellefteå from 1986 to 1992 and from 1994 to 2010. She was a member of the municipal council in Skellefteå Municipality from 2006 to 2010.

References

1954 births
21st-century Swedish women politicians
Living people
Members of the Riksdag 2010–2014
Members of the Riksdag 2014–2018
Members of the Riksdag from the Social Democrats
People from Skellefteå Municipality
Swedish schoolteachers
Women members of the Riksdag